Aulum station is a railway station serving the railway town of Aulum in Central Jutland, Denmark.

Aulum station is located on the Vejle-Holstebro railway line. The station was opened in 1904 with the opening of the Herning-Holstebro section of the Vejle-Holstebro Line. The station building was designed by the Danish architect Heinrich Wenck. It offers direct InterCityLyn services to Copenhagen operated by the railway company DSB as well as regional train services to Fredericia, Aarhus and Struer operated by Arriva.

See also
 List of railway stations in Denmark

References

Citations

Bibliography

External links
 Banedanmark – government agency responsible for maintenance and traffic control of most of the Danish railway network
 DSB – largest Danish train operating company
 Arriva – British multinational public transport company operating bus and train services in Denmark
 Danske Jernbaner – website with information on railway history in Denmark

Railway stations opened in 1904
Railway stations in the Central Denmark Region
Railway stations in Denmark opened in the 20th century